Lee Chang-min may refer to:

Lee Chang-min (singer)
Lee Chang-min (footballer)